Alice Miller, born as Alicja Englard (12 January 1923 – 14 April 2010), was a Polish-Swiss psychologist, psychoanalyst and philosopher of Jewish origin, who is noted for her books on parental child abuse, translated into several languages. She was also a noted public intellectual.

Her book The Drama of the Gifted Child caused a sensation and became an international bestseller upon the English publication in 1981. Her views on the consequences of child abuse became highly influential. In her books she departed from psychoanalysis, charging it with being similar to the poisonous pedagogies.

Life
Miller was born in Piotrków Trybunalski, Poland into a Jewish family. She was the oldest daughter of Gutta and Meylech Englard and had a sister, Irena, who was five years younger. From 1931 to 1933 the family lived in Berlin, where nine-year-old Alicja learned the German language. Due to the National Socialists' seizure of power in Germany in 1933 the family turned back to Piotrków Trybunalski. As a young woman, Miller managed to escape the Jewish Ghetto in Piotrków Trybunalski, where all Jewish inhabitants were interned since October 1939, and survived World War II in Warsaw under the assumed name of Alicja Rostowska. While she was able to smuggle her mother and sister out, in 1941, her father died in the ghetto.

She retained her assumed name Alice Rostowska when she moved to Switzerland in 1946, where she had won a scholarship to the University of Basel.

In 1949 she married Swiss sociologist Andreas Miller, originally a Polish Catholic, with whom she had moved from Poland to Switzerland as students. They divorced in 1973. They had two children, Martin (born 1950) and Julika (born 1956). Shortly after his mother's death Martin Miller stated in an interview with Der Spiegel that he had been beaten by his authoritarian father during his childhood - in the presence of his mother. Miller stated that his mother did not intervene and was emotionally abusive. These events happened decades before Alice Miller's awakening about the dangers of such childrearing methods. Martin also mentioned that his mother was unable to talk with him, despite numerous lengthy conversations, about her wartime experiences, as she was severely burdened by them.

In 1953 Miller got her doctorate in philosophy, psychology and sociology. Between 1953 and 1960, Miller studied psychoanalysis and practiced it between 1960 and 1980 in Zürich.

In 1980, after having worked as a psychoanalyst and an analyst trainer for 20 years, Miller "stopped practicing and teaching psychoanalysis in order to explore childhood systematically." She became critical of both Sigmund Freud and Carl Jung. Her first three books originated from research she took upon herself as a response to what she felt were major blind spots in her field. However, by the time her fourth book was published, she no longer believed that psychoanalysis was viable in any respect.

In 1985 Miller wrote about the research from her time as a psychoanalyst: "For twenty years I observed people denying their childhood traumas, idealising their parents and resisting the truth about their childhood by any means." In 1985 she left Switzerland and moved to Saint-Rémy-de-Provence in Southern France.

In 1986, she was awarded the Janusz Korczak Literary Award for her book Thou Shalt Not Be Aware: Society's Betrayal of the Child.

In April 1987 Miller announced in an interview with the German magazine Psychologie Heute (Psychology Today) her rejection of psychoanalysis. The following year she cancelled her memberships in both the Swiss Psychoanalytic Society and the International Psychoanalytic Association, because she felt that psychoanalytic theory and practice made it impossible for former victims of child abuse to recognise the violations inflicted on them and to resolve the consequences of the abuse, as they "remained in the old tradition of blaming the child and protecting the parents".

One of Miller's last books, Bilder meines Lebens ("Pictures of My Life"), was published in 2006. It is an informal autobiography in which the writer explores her emotional process from painful childhood, through the development of her theories and later insights, told via the display and discussion of 66 of her original paintings, painted in the years 1973–2005.

Between 2005 and her death in 2010, she answered hundreds of readers' letters on her website, where there are also published articles, flyers and interviews in three languages. Days before her death Alice Miller wrote: "These letters will stay as an important witness also after my death under my copyright".

Miller died on 14 April 2010, at the age of 87, at her home in Saint-Rémy-de-Provence by suicide after severe illness and diagnosis of advanced-stage pancreatic cancer.

Work
Miller extended the trauma model to include all forms of child abuse, including those that were commonly accepted (such as spanking), which she called poisonous pedagogy, a non-literal translation of Katharina Rutschky's Schwarze Pädagogik (black or dark pedagogy/imprinting).

Drawing upon the work of psychohistory, Miller analyzed writers Virginia Woolf, Franz Kafka and others to find links between their childhood traumas and the course and outcome of their lives.

The introduction to the first chapter in Miller's first book, The Drama of the Gifted Child, first published in 1979, contains a line that summarises her core view. In it, she writes:

In the 1990s, Miller strongly supported a new method developed by Konrad Stettbacher, who himself was later charged with incidents of sexual abuse. Miller learned of Stettbacher and his method from a book by Mariella Mehr titled Steinzeit (Stone Age). Having been strongly impressed by the book, Miller contacted Mehr in order to get the name of the therapist. From that time forward, Miller refused to make therapist or method recommendations. In open letters, Miller explained her decision and how she originally became Stettbacher's disciple, but in the end she distanced herself from him and his regressive therapies.

In her writings, Miller is careful to clarify that by "abuse" she does not only mean physical violence or sexual abuse, she is also concerned with psychological abuse perpetrated by one or both parents on their child; this is difficult to identify and deal with because the abused person is likely to conceal it from themselves and may not be aware of it until some event, or the onset of depression, requires it to be treated. Miller blamed psychologically abusive parents for the majority of neuroses and psychoses. She maintained that all instances of mental illness, addiction, crime and cultism were ultimately caused by suppressed rage and pain as a result of subconscious childhood trauma that was not resolved emotionally, assisted by a helper, which she came to term an "enlightened witness." In all cultures, "sparing the parents is our supreme law," wrote Miller. Even psychiatrists, psychoanalysts and clinical psychologists were unconsciously afraid to blame parents for the mental disorders of their clients, she contended. According to Miller, mental health professionals were also creatures of the poisonous pedagogy internalised in their own childhood. This explained why the Commandment "Honor thy parents" was one of the main targets in Miller's school of psychology.

Miller called electroconvulsive therapy "a campaign against the act of remembering". In her book Abbruch der Schweigemauer (The Demolition of Silence), she also criticised psychotherapists' advice to clients to forgive their abusive parents, arguing that this could only hinder recovery through remembering and feeling childhood pain. It was her contention that the majority of therapists fear this truth and that they work under the influence of interpretations culled from both Western and Oriental religions, which preach forgiveness by the once-mistreated child. She believed that forgiveness did not resolve hatred, but covered it in a dangerous way in the grown adult: displacement on scapegoats, as she discussed in her psycho-biographies of Adolf Hitler and Jürgen Bartsch, both of whom she described as having suffered severe parental abuse.

A common denominator in Miller's writings is her explanation of why human beings prefer not to know about their own victimisation during childhood: to avoid unbearable pain. She believed that the unconscious command of the individual, not to be aware of how they were treated in childhood, led to displacement: the irresistible drive to repeat abusive parenting in the next generation of children or direct unconsciously the unresolved trauma against others (war, terrorism, delinquency), or against themselves (eating disorders, drug addiction, depression).

The roots of violence

According to Alice Miller, worldwide violence has its roots in the fact that children are beaten all over the world, especially during their first years of life, when their brains become structured. She said that the damage caused by this practice is devastating, but unfortunately hardly noticed by society. She argued that as children are forbidden to defend themselves against the violence inflicted on them, they must suppress the natural reactions like rage and fear, and they discharge these strong emotions later as adults against their own children or whole peoples: "child abuse like beating and humiliating not only produces unhappy and confused children, not only destructive teenagers and abusive parents, but thus also a confused, irrationally functioning society". Miller stated that only through becoming aware of this dynamic can we break the chain of violence.

Writings
The following is a brief summary of Miller's books.

The Drama of the Gifted Child (Das Drama des begabten Kindes, 1979) 

In her first book (also published under the titles Prisoners of Childhood and The Drama of Being a Child), Miller defined and elaborated the personality manifestations of childhood trauma. She addressed the two reactions to the loss of love in childhood, depression and grandiosity; the inner prison, the vicious circle of contempt, repressed memories, the etiology of depression, and how childhood trauma manifests itself in the adult.

Miller writes:

"Quite often I have been faced with patients who have been praised and admired for their talents and their achievements. According to prevailing, general attitudes these people--the pride of their parents--should have had a strong stable sense of self-assurance. But exactly the opposite is the case… In my work with these people, I found that every one of them has a childhood history that seems significant to me:
 There was a mother who at the core was emotionally insecure, and who depended for her narcissistic equilibrium on the child behaving, or acting, in a particular way. This mother was able to hide her insecurity from the child and from everyone else behind a hard, authoritarian and even totalitarian façade.
 This child had an amazing ability to perceive and respond intuitively, that is, unconsciously, to this need of the mother or of both parents, for him to take on the role that had unconsciously been assigned to him.
 This role secured "love" for the child—that is, his parents' exploitation. He could sense that he was needed, and this need, guaranteed him a measure of existential security.
This ability is then extended and perfected. Later, these children not only become mothers (confidantes, advisers, supporters) of their own mothers, but also take over the responsibility for their siblings and eventually develop a special sensitivity to unconscious signals manifesting the needs of others."

For Your Own Good (Am Anfang war Erziehung, 1980) 

Miller proposed here that German traumatic childrearing produced heroin addict Christiane F., serial killer of children Jürgen Bartsch, and dictator Adolf Hitler. Children learn to accept their parents' often abusive behaviour against themselves as being "for their own good." In the case of Hitler, it led to displacement against the Jews and other minority groups. For Miller, the traditional pedagogic process of spanking was manipulative, resulting in grown-up adults deferring excessively to authorities, even to tyrannical leaders or dictators, like Hitler. Miller even argued for abandoning the term "pedagogy" in favour of the word "support," something akin to what psychohistorians call the helping mode of parenting.

In the Poisonous Pedagogy section of the book, Miller does a thorough survey of 19th century child-rearing literature in the book, citing texts which recommend practices such as exposing children to dead bodies in order to teach them about the sexual functions of human anatomy (45–46), resisting the temptation to comfort screaming infants (41–43), and beating children who haven't committed any specific offense as a kind of conditioning that would help them to understand their own evil and fallen nature.

The key element that Miller elucidated in this book was the understanding of why the German nation, the "good Germans," were compliant with Hitler's abusive regime, which Miller asserted was a direct result of how the society in general treated its children. She raised fundamental questions about current, worldwide child-rearing practices and issued a stern warning.

Thou Shalt Not Be Aware  (Du sollst nicht merken, 1981) 

Unlike Miller's later books, this one is written in a semi-academic style. It was her first critique of psychoanalysis, charging it with being similar to the poisonous pedagogies, which she described in For Your Own Good. Miller was critical of both Freud and Carl Jung. She scrutinised Freud's drive theory, a device that, according to her and Jeffrey Masson, blames the child for the abusive sexual behaviour of adults. Miller also theorised about Franz Kafka, who was abused by his father but fulfilled the politically correct function of mirroring abuse in metaphorical novels, instead of exposing it.

In the chapter entitled "The Pain of Separation and Autonomy," Miller examined the authoritarian (e.g.: Old Testament, Papist, Calvinist) interpretation of Judeo-Christian theism and its parallels to modern parenting practice, asserting that it was Jesus's father Joseph who should be credited with Jesus's departure from the dogmatic Judaism of his time.

The Untouched Key  (Der gemiedene Schlüssel, 1988) 

This book was partly a psychobiography of Nietzsche, Picasso, Kollwitz and Buster Keaton; (in Miller's later book, The Body Never Lies, published in 2005, she included similar analyses of Dostoyevsky, Chekhov, Schiller, Rimbaud, Mishima, Proust and James Joyce).

According to Miller, Nietzsche did not experience a loving family and his philosophical output was a metaphor of an unconscious drive against his family's oppressive theological tradition. She believed that the philosophical system was flawed because Nietzsche was unable to make emotional contact with the abused child inside him. Though Nietzsche was severely punished by a father who lost his mind when Nietzsche was a little boy, Miller did not accept the genetic theory of madness. She interpreted Nietzsche's psychotic breakdown as the result of a family tradition of Prussian modes of child-rearing.

Banished Knowledge (Das verbannte Wissen, 1988) 

In this more personal book Miller said that she herself was abused as a child. She also introduced the fundamental concept of "enlightened witness": a person who was willing to support a harmed individual, empathise with her and help her to gain understanding of her own biographical past.

Banished Knowledge is autobiographical in another sense. It is a pointer in Miller's thoroughgoing apostasy from her own profession—psychoanalysis. She believed society was colluding with Freud's theories in order to not know the truth about our childhood, a truth that human cultures have "banished." She concluded that the feelings of guilt instilled in our minds since our most tender years reinforce our repression even in the psychoanalytic profession.

Breaking Down the Wall of Silence  (Abbruch der Schweigemauer, 1990) 
Written in the aftermath of the fall of the Berlin Wall, Miller took to task the entirety of human culture. What she called the "wall of silence" is the metaphorical wall behind which society — academia, psychiatrists, clergy, politicians and members of the media — has sought to protect itself: denying the mind-destroying effects of child abuse. She also continued the autobiographical confession initiated in Banished Knowledge about her abusive mother. In Pictures of a Childhood: Sixty-six Watercolours and an Essay, Miller said that painting helped her to ponder deeply into her memories. In some of her paintings, Miller depicted baby Alice as swaddled, sometimes by an evil mother.

In a New York Times obituary of 26 April 2010 British psychologist Oliver James is quoted saying that Alice Miller "is almost as influential as R.D. Laing."

Bibliography
Miller's published books in English:
 The Drama of the Gifted Child, (1979), revised in 1995 and re-published by Virago as The Drama of Being a Child. 
 Prisoners of Childhood (1981) , which is The Drama of the Gifted Child under a different title
 For Your Own Good: Hidden Cruelty in Child-Rearing and the Roots of Violence (full text is available online for free) (1983) 
 Thou Shalt Not Be Aware: Society's Betrayal of the Child (1984) 
 Banished Knowledge: Facing Childhood Injuries 
 The Untouched Key: Tracing Childhood Trauma in Creativity and Destructiveness 
 The Drama of Being a Child : The Search for the True Self (1995)
 Pictures of a Childhood: Sixty-six Watercolours and an Essay 
 Paths of Life: Seven Scenarios (1999) 
 Breaking Down the Wall of Silence: The Liberating Experience of Facing Painful Truth 
 The Truth Will Set You Free: Overcoming Emotional Blindness (2001) 
 The Body Never Lies: The Lingering Effects of Cruel Parenting (2005) , Excerpt
 Free From Lies: Discovering Your True Needs (2009) 

In popular culture:
 Are You My Mother? by Alison Bechdel

See also

References

Bibliography

External links

 Alice Miller's website
 Interview by Diane Connors (1997)
 Alice Miller Library
 Alice Miller Peace Foundation - Encouraging Peacebuilding Through the Protection of Children From Violence

Book reviews
 Paths of Life: Seven Scenarios reviewed by Steven Khamsi
 The Body Never Lies: The Lingering Effects of Cruel Parenting reviewed by Steven Khamsi

Child abuse
1923 births
2010 deaths
20th-century Polish Jews
Polish women novelists
Swiss women novelists
Polish women psychologists
Swiss women psychologists
Swiss sociologists
Polish women sociologists
Swiss psychoanalysts
Jewish psychoanalysts
20th-century Swiss novelists
University of Basel alumni
20th-century women writers
Polish emigrants to Switzerland
Polish expatriates in Germany